This is a list of the Europarade number-one singles of 1977.

1977 record charts
Lists of number-one songs in Europe